2018 Cambodian League is the 34th season of the Cambodian League. Contested by 12 clubs, it operates on a system of promotion and relegation with Cambodian Second League. The league starts from 3 March until 30 September. 
Boeung Ket are the defending champions. Nagaworld FC won the champion again after waiting since 2009.

2018 season clubs

Teams

Source: FIFA Soccerway Cambodian League

Personnel and Kits

Foreign players

The number of foreign players is restricted to five per team. A team can use four foreign players on the field in each game, including at least one player from the AFC country.

Players name in bold indicates the player is registered during the mid-season transfer window.

League table

Results

Results table

Results by match played

Season statistics

Top scorers

Hat-tricks

Note:
(H) – Home; (A) – Away
6 player scored 6 goals
5 player scored 5 goals
4 player scored 4 goals

Awards

See also
2018 Hun Sen Cup

References

Cambodia
C-League seasons
1